MVCC may refer to:

 Mohawk Valley Community College, Rome and Utica, New York, United States
 Montevideo Cricket Club, a multisport club in Uruguay
 Moonee Valley City Council, a local government area in Melbourne, Victoria, Australia
 Moraine Valley Community College, Palos Hills, Illinois, United States
 Multiversion concurrency control, a database feature